The 2022 Milan–San Remo was a road cycling one-day race that took place on 19 March 2022 in northwestern Italy. It was the 113th edition of the Milan–San Remo cycling classic. Originally the eighth event on the 2022 UCI World Tour calendar, it became the sixth event after the cancellation of the Tour Down Under and the Cadel Evans Great Ocean Road Race.

In a similar move to the one that won Jasper Stuyven the previous edition, Matej Mohorič attacked on the descent of the Poggio di San Remo with under  to go and soloed to the win. Anthony Turgis, who had attacked in the final kilometre to try to bridge the gap to Mohorič, stayed ahead of the chasing group to finish second, with Mathieu van der Poel winning the sprint for third from the aforementioned group.

Teams 
The next best ProTeam from the 2021 season,  also received an automatic invitation, while four additional UCI ProTeams received wild card invitations.

Twenty-four teams participated in the race. Of the 165 riders who took part in the race, 159 finished.

UCI WorldTeams

 
 
 
 
 
 
 
 
 
 
 
 
 
 
 
 
 
 

UCI ProTeams

Result

References

External links 
 

2022
Milan-San Remo
Milan-San Remo
Milan-San Remo